Gary Philip Saxby (born 11 December 1959) is an English former professional footballer who played in the Football League for Mansfield Town and Northampton Town.

References

1959 births
Living people
English footballers
Association football midfielders
English Football League players
Mansfield Town F.C. players
Northampton Town F.C. players
Stamford A.F.C. players
Stafford Rangers F.C. players